Zhou Liqi (born December 27, 1984) is a Chinese slacker culture influencer and thief. He became famous in 2016 after a 2012 video went viral of him being questioned by local police in Guangxi after being arrested for stealing electric bicycles. The Chinese government has criticized him as part of an effort to suppress slacker culture, censored fan videos praising him using the nickname Qie Guevara, and threatened to blacklist talent agencies that work with him.

References

External links 

People from Guangxi
Chinese criminals
Internet memes introduced in 2016
Social media influencers
1984 births
Living people
Chinese Internet celebrities